The men's sanda (as Sanshou) 70 kg at the 2006 Asian Games in Doha, Qatar was held from 11 to 14 December at the Aspire Hall 3 in Aspire Zone.

A total of thirteen competitors from thirteen different countries competed in this event, limited to fighters whose body weight was less than 70 kilograms.

Xu Yanfei from China won the gold medal after beating Eduard Folayang in gold medal bout 2–0.

Schedule
All times are Arabia Standard Time (UTC+03:00)

Results
Legend
DQ — Won by disqualification
KO — Won by knockout

References

Results

External links
Official website

Men's sanda 70 kg